
The Avia BH-8 was a prototype fighter aircraft built in Czechoslovakia in 1923. It was an unequal-span biplane developed on the basis of the ill-fated BH-6 design, in an attempt to address that type's problems. It shared the BH-6's unusual wing cellule design.

When test-flown in late 1923, it did indeed display better flying characteristics than its predecessor, but was overtaken in development by another variation of the same design, the BH-17.

Specifications

See also

References

 
 
 Němeček, V. (1968). Československá letadla. Praha: Naše Vojsko.
 airwar.ru

1920s Czechoslovakian fighter aircraft
BH-08
Biplanes
Single-engined tractor aircraft